The University of Memphis, School of Law building (also commonly known as the Customs House, Post Office, or Courthouse reflecting its prior uses) is a 5-story former federal building, located in downtown Memphis. As of 2010, the building is owned entirely by the University of Memphis and houses its law school.  It is located at the corner of Front Street and Madison Avenue.  It has  of usable space that has been re-purposed as classrooms, offices, and administrative space.  One of the original courtrooms from the building's former use as a courthouse has been restored as the University of Memphis moot courtroom.  The building is made of steel and concrete, and employs many decorative elements including Tennessee marble, granite, and detailed plaster work.

Location

The building, which has an address of 1 North Front Street, sits just west of Court Square, Memphis.  The building's location on a natural bluff overlooking the Mississippi River affords it magnificent westerly views of the river, including Mud Island, and Arkansas.  Because of its location on a natural promontory, the building was not affected by the 2011 Mississippi River floods.

History

The building was built originally in the 1880s to house the U.S. Customs House, but it provided space for several other federal offices.  Locally, it became known as the "Customs House."  Over the following one hundred years, the U.S. federal building served many purposes, including as the federal courthouse, customs house, and post office. The building underwent a large expansion in 1929–1930, creating new a new facade on Front Street.

It was placed on the National Register of Historic Places in 1980.

Current Use

After extensive award-winning renovations, in 2010 the building became home to the University of Memphis, School of Law.  As such, it houses the University of Memphis Law Review offices, as well as the University of Memphis, Legal Aid Clinic.

Gallery

See also
University of Memphis, School of Law
List of tallest buildings in Memphis
Downtown Memphis

References

External links
Emporis Listing of building

Buildings and structures in Memphis, Tennessee
University of Memphis
National Register of Historic Places in Memphis, Tennessee
Courthouses on the National Register of Historic Places in Tennessee
Post office buildings on the National Register of Historic Places in Tennessee
Former courthouses in the United States
Former post office buildings
Custom houses on the National Register of Historic Places
1885 establishments in Tennessee